Handsome Devil is a punk band that consists of members Danny Walker (vocals, guitar), Billie Stevens (guitar), Keith Morgan (drums), and Darren Roberts (bass). Originally formed in the spring of 2000 and hailing from Orange County, CA (the same place that spawned Lit, No Doubt, and Social Distortion), Handsome Devil is musically comparable to their regional forefathers, as they list such diverse artists as The Clash, Ozzy Osbourne, The Beatles, The Descendents, and Elvis Costello as important influences who helped shape their sound. The group signed to Lit's Dirty Martini label shortly after forming, and they hit the road opening for such bands as Hoobastank, Zebrahead, and Sprung Monkey. The band toured extensively in 2000 and the first half of 2001 before recording an album. Handsome Devil's debut release, Love & Kisses From the Underground, was issued in September 2001 (although many stores didn't get the album until well after the September 11 release date due to shipping delays brought on by the September 11 attacks.)

Two years later, they followed up with the release of Knock Yourself Out. Handsome Devil self-produced half of the new album, and co-produced the other half with Jeremy Popoff (Lit), with one song, "What You See", co-produced by veteran rock producer Ed Stasium (The Ramones, Talking Heads). The music video for the single, "Hello Somebody", was directed by music video director, Allen M. Gottfried and gained nationwide airplay in support of the album release.

Their third album, Fully Automatic, was released in 2006.

Lineup
 Danny Walker - Vocals/Guitar
 Billie Stevens - Guitar
 Keith Morgan - Drums
 Darren Roberts - Bass guitar

Former members
 Brian Wedmore - Bass guitar

Discography
 Love and Kisses from the Underground (2001)
 Knock Yourself Out (2004)
 Fully Automatic (2006)

Music videos
 "Makin' Money" (2001)
 "Bring It On" (2002)
 "Hello Somebody" (2004)

External links
 Handsome Devil on Myspace

Punk rock groups from California
Musical groups from Orange County, California